Gloria D. Miklowitz (May 18, 1927 in New York City – January 20, 2015 in Pasadena, California) was an American author of more than 60 fiction and non-fiction books for young adults. Her books have won national and international awards and deal with important issues such as nuclear war, racial injustice, steroid abuse, date violence and militia involvement.

Early life 
Miklowitz was born in New York and wrote her first story "My Brother Goo Goo" in third grade. Miklowitz graduated from the University of Michigan in 1948 with a degree in English. She worked at Bantam Books in New York briefly and then worked at the U.S. Naval Ordinance Test Station near Pasadena, California after moving there with her husband in 1951.

Career
Miklowitz was the author of more than 60 fiction and nonfiction books for children and young adults. Her books have won national and international awards and deal with important issues such as nuclear war, racial injustice, steroid abuse, date violence and most recently militia involvement. Three of her novels were made into award-winning television specials, including one which won the Emmy for "Best Children’s Special" in 1986 (The War Between the Classes). A frequent speaker at schools, Gloria has also taken part in conferences in the United States, South Africa and Sweden.

Series
After the Bomb
After the Bomb (1984)
Week One (1987)

Novels
The Marshmallow Caper (1971)
Sad Song, Happy Song (1973)
Turning Off (1973)
Time to Hurt, a Time to Heal (1976)
Earthquake! (1977)
Paramedic Emergency! (1977)
Unwed Mother (1977)
Save That Raccoon (1978)
Did You Hear What Happened to Andrea? (1979)
The Love Bombers (1980)
Close to the Edge (1983)
Carrie Loves Superman (1983)
The Day the Senior Class Got Married: A Novel (1983)
Runaway (1984)
The War Between the Classes (1985)
Love Story Take Three (1986)
Secrets Not Meant to Be Kept (1987)
Good-Bye Tomorrow (1987)
Emerson High Vigilantes (1988)
Anything to Win (1989)
Standing Tall, Looking Good (1990)
Desperate Pursuit (1992)
The Killing Boy (1993)
Past Forgiving (1995)
Camouflage (1998)
Masada: The Last Fortress (1998)
Secrets in the House of Delgado (2001)
The Enemy Has a Face (2003)

Collections
Ghastly Ghostly Riddles (1977)

Non fiction
Harry Truman (1975)
Nadia Comaneci (1977)
Natalie Dunn: World Roller Skating Champion (1979)
Movie Stunts and the People Who Do Them (1980)
The Young Tycoons: Ten Success Stories (1981) (with Madeleine Yates)

Family 
She married Julius Miklowitz in 1948. She had two children- who are both college professors. All four of the Miklowitz's are published authors. .

References

External links

 
 Gloria D. Miklowitz at FantasticFiction.com

1927 births
2015 deaths
Writers from New York City
American women short story writers
American women novelists
University of Michigan alumni
20th-century American women writers
21st-century American women writers
20th-century American novelists
21st-century American novelists
20th-century American short story writers
21st-century American short story writers
Novelists from New York (state)